Uno August "Uuno" Railo (born Rosenberg, 5 January 1887 – 10 November 1934) was a Finnish sprinter.

Athletics 

Railo was one of the most talented Finnish track and field athletes of his generation.

He entered to compete in five events at the 1908 Summer Olympics: 100 metres, 200 metres, 400 metres, long jump and triple jump. He couldn't start due to a muscle strain.

He won four Finnish national championship golds in track and field athletics:
 100 metres in 1907 and 1909
 400 metres in 1909
 combined standing and running long jump in 1907

He represented the club Tampereen Pyrintö and was its board member in 1908–1909.

Records 

He posted two world leading results of the year:
 100 metres, 10.8 seconds; in Tampere, Finland; 1907
 long jump, 716 centimetres; Waugekan, Illinois, United States; 1911

He broke four Finnish national records:
 long jump, 649 centimetres, in Tampere on 3 July 1907
 100 metres, 11.0 and 10.8 seconds, both in Tampere on 4 August 1907. The latter stood for 28 years.
 200 metres, 23.4 seconds, in Tampere on 5 September 1909

He also clocked 100 metres in 10.6 seconds in 1907, but this result was considered unreliable.

Biography 

He finnicized his familyname from Rosenberg to Railo on 12 May 1906.

He moved to the United States in 1910. He lived in Waukegan, Illinois and worked as a millwright at a wire mill. He died in an accident on a fishing trip.

References 

Finnish male sprinters
Finnish male hurdlers
American people of Finnish descent
1887 births
1934 deaths
Sportspeople from Tampere